Rodolphe Rubattel (4 September 1896 – 18 October 1961), was a Swiss politician.

He was elected to the Swiss Federal Council on 11 December 1947 and handed over office on 31 December 1954. 
He was affiliated to the Free Democratic Party. During his time in office he held the Federal Department of Economic Affairs.

He was President of the Confederation in 1954.

External links

Swiss Diplomatic Documents (DDS)

1896 births
1961 deaths
People from Broye-Vully District
Swiss Calvinist and Reformed Christians
Free Democratic Party of Switzerland politicians
Members of the Federal Council (Switzerland)